In aerospace, Maxime Guillaume (born 1888) was an agricultural engineer who filed a French patent for a turbojet engine in 1921.

The first patent for using a gas turbine to power an aircraft was filed in 1921 by  Guillaume. ," French patent no. 534,801 (filed: 3 May 1921; issued: 13 January 1922).  His engine was to be an axial-flow turbojet, but was never constructed, as it would have required considerable advances over the state of the art in compressors.

References

20th-century French inventors
Jet engine pioneers